Compulsory purchase is the power to acquire rights over an estate in English land law, or to buy that estate outright, without the current owner's consent in return for compensation. In England and Wales, Parliament has granted several different kinds of compulsory purchase power, which are exercisable by various bodies in various situations.  Such powers are "for the public benefit", but this expression is interpreted very broadly.

History

Although land may be acquired by consent, and conduct which raises another party's reasonable expectations, these private methods of acquiring land are often insufficient for adequate public regulation. Building national infrastructure, such as railways, housing, and sewerage, as well as democratically determined planning rules, either by national or local government, typically requires compulsory purchase, because private owners might not give up land required for public works except at an extortionate price. Historically, compulsory purchases were carried out under the Inclosure Acts and their predecessors, where enclosure was frequently a method of expropriating people from common land for the benefit of barons and landlords. In the industrial revolution, most railways were built by private companies procuring compulsory purchase rights from private Acts of Parliament, though by the late 19th century, powers of compulsory purchase slowly became more transparent and used for general social welfare, as with the Public Health Act 1875, or the Housing of the Working Classes Act 1885. Compulsory purchase legislation was significantly extended during the First World War for military use, and after the war for housing, as certain principles became standardised.

Local authority purchase
Today, the Land Compensation Act 1961 section 5 generally requires that the owner of an interest in land (e.g. a freehold, leasehold or easement as in Re Ellenborough Park) receives payment for the "value of the land ... if sold on an open market by a willing seller". Compensation is often also available for losses to a home, or if one's business has to move. The Compulsory Purchase Act 1965 sets conditions for a purchase to be made, and the Acquisition of Land Act 1981 regulates the conditions for granting a "Compulsory Purchase Order". Typically, either central government represented by a Secretary of State, or a local council will be interested in making a compulsory purchase. The authority of local councils for make purchases for specific reasons can be set out in specific legislation, such as the Highways Act 1980 to build roads when strictly necessary. However the Town and Country Planning Act 1990 section 226, which allows compulsory purchase to "facilitate the carrying out of development, re-development or improvement" for the area's economic, social, or environmental well being, must be confirmed by the Secretary of State, and similarly the Local Government Act 1972 section 121 requires the council seek approval from the government Minister.

Leasehold purchase

The most general power originally appeared in the Leasehold Reform Act 1967. Under that Act, the Leasehold Reform Act 1987, and the Leasehold Reform, Housing and Urban Development Act 1992, private individuals who are leaseholders have the power in certain circumstances to compel their landlord to extend a lease or to sell the freehold at a valuation.

Recompense, under compulsory purchase, is not necessarily a monetary payment of open market value (see James v United Kingdom [1986]), but in most cases a sum equivalent to a valuation made as if between a willing seller and a willing purchaser will fall due to the previous owner.

Utility companies
Utility companies have statutory powers to, for example, erect electrical substations or lay sewers or water pipes on or through someone else's land.  These powers are counterbalanced by corresponding rights for landowners to compel utility companies to remove cables, pipes or sewers in other circumstances (see for example section 185 of the Water Industry Act 1991).

Compulsory purchase only applies to the extent that it is necessary for the purchaser's purposes.  Thus, for example, a water authority does not need to buy the freehold in land in order to run a sewer through it.  An easement will normally suffice, so in such cases the water authority may only acquire an easement through the use of compulsory purchase.

Procedure
In most cases a Compulsory Purchase Order (CPO) is made by the purchasing authority or the Secretary of State.  The CPO must unambiguously identify the land affected and set out the owners, where these are known.  The order is then served on all owners and tenants with a tenancy with more than a month to run, or affixed to the land if some owners or tenants cannot be traced.  A period of at least 21 days is allowed for objections. If there is a valid objection that is not withdrawn, an inquiry chaired by an inspector will take place.  The inspector reports to the Secretary of State.  If the Secretary of State confirms the CPO, then it becomes very difficult to challenge.

Once the CPO is confirmed, the purchasing authority must serve a Notice to Treat within three years, and a Notice of Entry within a further three years.  It may take possession of the land not less than 14 days after serving the Notice of Entry. The Notice to Treat requires the land's owner to respond, and is usually the trigger for the land's owner to submit a claim for its value. If no claim is submitted within 21 days of the Notice to Treat, the acquirer can refer the matter to the Lands Tribunal. If the land's owner cannot be traced and does not respond to a Notice to Treat affixed to the land, then the purchasing authority must pay the compensation figure to the Court.

Crichel Down rules

The Crichel Down principles oblige central and local government, when, having acquired an estate compulsorily, they find they no longer need it, to offer it in the first instance to the person from whom they acquired it at its market value. However, this only applies where the land has not materially changed in character, and does not withstand the principle that councils may not dispose of land "for a consideration less than the best that can be obtained" under the Local Government Act 1972, section 123. This means that where it is difficult to value land for some reason, the land may need to be sold by tender or auction.

Human rights
Because of property's social importance, either for personal consumption and use or for mass production, compulsory purchase laws have met with human rights challenges. One concern is that since the 1980s privatisations, many compulsory purchase powers can be used for the benefit of private corporations whose incentives may diverge from the public interest. For example, the Water Resources Act 1991 continues to allow government bodies to order compulsory purchases of people's property, although profits go to the private shareholders of UK water companies. In R (Sainsbury's Supermarkets Ltd) v Wolverhampton CC the Supreme Court held that Wolverhampton City Council acted for an improper purpose when it took into account a promise by Tesco to redevelop another site, in determining whether to make a compulsory purchase order over a site possessed by Sainsbury's. Lord Walker stressed that "powers of compulsory acquisition, especially in a 'private to private' acquisition, amounts to a serious invasion of the current owner's proprietary rights. Nevertheless compulsory purchase orders have frequently been used to acquire land that is passed back to a private owner, including in Alliance Spring Ltd v First Secretary where homes in Islington were purchased to build the Emirates stadium for Arsenal Football Club. By contrast, in James v United Kingdom, Gerald Grosvenor, 6th Duke of Westminster, the inherited owner of most of Mayfair and Belgravia, contended that leaseholders' right to buy had violated their right to property in ECHR Protocol 1, article 1. The European Court of Human Rights ruled that the Leasehold Reform Act 1967, which allowed tenants to purchase properties from their private landlords, was within a member state's margin of appreciation. It was competent for a member state to regulate property rights in the public interest.

Cases and statutes
Land Clauses Consolidation Act 1845, removed the need for special private Acts for compulsory purchases driven by the railways
Inclosure Act 1845, established Inclosure Commissioners to hear petitions for compulsory purchase and development
Housing of the Working Classes Act 1885
Housing of the Working Classes Act 1890
Attorney-General v Great Eastern Railway Company (1880) 5 App Cas 473, 478
Ayr Harbour Trustees v Oswald (1883) 8 App Cas 623
Attorney-General v Manchester Corporation [1906] 1 Ch 643
Attorney-General v De Keyser's Royal Hotel Ltd [1920] AC 508
Stourcliffe Estates Co Ltd v Bournemouth Corporation [1910] 2 Ch 12
Defence of the Realm (Acquisition of Land) Act 1916
Acquisition of Land (Assessment of Compensation) Act 1919
Acquisition of Land (Authorisation Procedure) Act 1946
Burmah Oil Co Ltd v Lord Advocate [1965] AC 75, 115. Lord Radcliffe: "The Crown has never claimed or sought to exercise in time of peace a right to take land except by agreement or under statutory power."
Prest v Secretary of State for Wales (1982) 81 LGR 193. Lord Denning MR: "It is clear that no minister or public authority can acquire any land compulsorily except the power to do so be given by Parliament: and Parliament only grants it, or should only grant it, when it is necessary in the public interest. In any case, therefore, where the scales are evenly balanced – for or against compulsory acquisition – the decision – by whomsoever it is made – should come down against compulsory acquisition. I regard it as a principle of our constitutional law that no citizen is to be deprived of his land by any public authority against his will, unless it is expressly authorised by Parliament and the public interest decisively so demands. If there is any reasonable doubt on the matter, the balance must be resolved in favour of the citizen."
Empty dwelling management orders, a form of "compulsory leasing"
Development consent orders
Channel Tunnel Act 1987
Compulsory Purchase (Vesting Declarations) Act 1981
Housing Act 1985
Housing Act 2004
Highways Act 1959
Highways Act 1980
Land Charges Act 1972
Planning Act 2008
Transport and Works Act 1992
Water Industry Act 1991
Compulsory Purchase by Ministers (Inquiries Procedure) Rules 1967
Compulsory Purchase by Non-Ministerial Acquiring Authorities (Inquiries Procedure) Rules 1990
Compulsory Purchase of Land Regulations 1990

References
Denyer-Green, Barry: Compulsory Purchase and Compensation, 8th edition.  London: The Estates Gazette Limited, 2005.  
Sydenham, Angela; Monnington, Bruce; and Pym, Andrew: Essential Law for Landowners and Farmers, 4th edition.  Chapter 8: Compulsory Purchase and Compensation. pp. 118–135.  Oxford: Blackwell Science Limited, 2002.

Notes

External links
 Land Compensation Act 1961 ss 1, 5-9
 Director of Buildings v Shun Fung Ltd [1995] UKPC 7
 Acquisition of Land Act 1981 ss 2-4, 10-15
 Compulsory Purchase Act 1965 s 1 ff
 Water Resources Act 1991 s 154
 R (Sainsury's Ltd) v Wolverhampton CC [2010] UKSC 20
 James v United Kingdom [1986] ECHR 2
 Alliance Spring Ltd v First Secretary [2005] EWHC 18 (Admin)
 Grape Bay Ltd v Attorney General of Bermuda [1999] UKPC 43
 Mariner Real Estate Ltd v Nova Scotia (1999) 177 DLR (4th) 696
 Matos e Silva, LDA v Portugal [1996] ECHR 37

English land law
Eminent domain